Don Lafferty (1933–1998) was a Grandmaster checkers (British English: draughts) player.  In 1982 he  defeated Derek Oldbury for the World GAYP (Go as you please) championship with a score of 1-0-23.  He was challenged for the championship in 1984 by Paul Davis, winning easily 5-0-15. In 1986 he defended his title again by drawing James Morrison with a score of 0-0-24 and in 1989 he defeated Elbert Lowder 4-3-16.

He contested for the 3-move restriction title twice in his career but never succeeded.  In 1987 he failed to defeat 
Marion Tinsley, losing by a score of 2-0-36.  In 1996 he tried again, this time against Ron King, but he only managed a 5-5-30 draw.

In his matches with Chinook he had 8 wins, 7 losses and 109 draws.

Personal life
He received his degree from Western Kentucky University. This served him well in his primary career as a high-school math and physics teacher until he retired in 1988.

Sources
 Don Lafferty biography
 Championship results

American checkers players
Players of English draughts
1933 births
1998 deaths
Western Kentucky University alumni